The Russian ironclad Kniaz Pozharsky was an iron-hulled armored frigate built for the Imperial Russian Navy during the 1860s. She was the first Russian armored ship to leave European waters when she cruised the Pacific Ocean in 1873–75. The ship did not participate in the Russo-Turkish War of 1877–78, and remained in the Baltic Sea until 1879–80, when she made another cruise to the Pacific. Kniaz Pozharsky was assigned to the Baltic Fleet for the rest of her career. She mainly served as a training ship after her refit in 1885 until she was hulked in 1909 and probably scrapped in 1911.

Design and description
Originally classified as an armored corvette, Kniaz Pozharsky was redesignated as an armored frigate on 20 November 1866. She was laid out as a central battery ironclad with the armament concentrated amidships. The ship was fitted with a ram and her crew numbered approximately 495 officers and enlisted men.

Kniaz Pozharsky was fitted with a double bottom and was considered to be a steady gun platform and a good sea boat.

Propulsion
The ship had a simple horizontal direct-acting steam engine driving a single two-bladed propeller. Steam was provided by eight cylindrical boilers. To reduce drag while under sail her funnel was retractable and her propeller could be hoisted into the hull.

Armament
Kniaz Pozharsky was armed with eight Obukhov  breech-loading guns. In an attempt to provide axial fire, the sides of the hull at the upper deck level were cut away in front of and behind the battery. While providing better coverage than the traditional broadside layout, this still left a considerable area on which no gun could bear.

Watts and Gardiner credit the ship with three spar torpedoes as well as three towed torpedoes, but these are not mentioned by Wright or Silverstone.

Armour
Figures for Kniaz Pozharskys armor protection vary between sources.

Service
Kniaz Pozharsky was laid down on 30 November 1864 at the Mitchell Shipyard in Saint Petersburg with the name of Pozharsky, but it was changed before she was launched on 12 September 1867. Sources differ on when the ship entered service; they give either 1870 or 1873. About 1873 Kniaz Pozharsky became the first Russian armored ship to deploy to the Pacific, but returned to the Baltic Fleet in 1875. She remained in the Baltic Sea during the Russo-Turkish War and the ensuing war scare with Great Britain. The ship made another cruise to the Pacific in 1879–80. Kniaz Pozharsky served as the flagship during the fleet maneuvers of 1884 and she was reviewed by Tsar Alexander III of Russia. The ship was extensively refitted the following year and received new boilers, her propeller was fixed in place and her retractable funnel was replaced by two fixed funnels.

Kniaz Pozharsky was rearmed during the refit, but sources differ on the light guns fitted. Two , 23-caliber guns were also fitted, possibly as chase guns. Wright and Watts agree that eight 4-pounder guns and four quick-firing guns of unspecified size were added; Silverstone does not mention the four quick-firers, but Gardiner says that four  guns were fitted. The ship was reclassified as a "cruiser of the 1st rank" in 1892 and her light armament was modified by the substitution of four  Hotchkiss guns for four of the 4-pounders and the addition of six  Hotchkiss guns. Two above-water  torpedo tubes were also added at this time.

After her refit, Kniaz Pozharsky served mostly as a training ship with the Naval School Division, although she was not formally reclassified as a school ship until 24 March 1906. After she was reclassified her armament was reduced to a single 6-inch gun, four 4-pounders, two 47-millimeter and six 37-millimeter Hotchkiss guns. The ship was hulked on 27 October 1909 and renamed Blokshiv No. 1. She was struck from the Navy List on 14 April 1911 and probably scrapped shortly afterward because the elderly monitor  was renamed as Blokshiv No. 1 that same day.

Notes

Footnotes

References

 

Naval ships of Russia
1867 ships
Ironclad warships of the Imperial Russian Navy
Ships built in Saint Petersburg